Forest Township is the name of some places in the U.S. state of Michigan:

 Forest Township, Cheboygan County, Michigan
 Forest Township, Genesee County, Michigan
 Forest Township, Missaukee County, Michigan

Michigan township disambiguation pages